Ira Sewaya (Sun Rise) is a 2015 Sri Lankan Sinhala drama film directed by Rodney Widanapathirana and produced by Kanthi Alahakone. It stars Wimal Alahakone and Rebeka Nirmali in lead roles along with Maureen Charuni and Ishara Wickremasinghe. Music composed by Manoj Peiris. Film was screened after the death of main actress Rebecca Nirmali. The film has been shot in Sri Lanka and England both. It is the 1244th Sri Lankan film in the Sinhala cinema. It was also screened in Nepal organized by Embassy of Sri Lanka in Kathmandu. The film was re-screened in 2021 at Ananda cinema in Gampola.

Plot

Cast
 Wimal Alahakone as Nalaka Sapumal Bandara
 Rebeka Nirmali as Lorain
 Maureen Charuni as Yvonne
 Ishara Wickremasinghe as Monk
 Samson Siripala
 Saman Almeida
 Sarath Chandrasiri
 Gamini Samarakoon

Awards
 Best upcoming Actor at Sarasaviya Film Festival 2016 - Ishara Wickremasinghe

Soundtrack

References

2015 films
2010s Sinhala-language films